Japoonvale is a rural locality in the Cassowary Coast Region, Queensland, Australia.

The town of Japoon is in the north-east of the locality.

History 
The town was named by surveyor W.J. Callendar and is an Aboriginal word meaning eels.

Stratvell State School opened on 2 August 1916 and closed on 31 December 2002. The school was located at 34 Stratvell Road.

Japoon West State School opened on 14 April 1925 and closed on 1 June 1927. The school building was relocated to Euramo.

Education 
There are no schools in Japoonvale. The nearest government primary schools are Silkwood State School in Silkwood to the east and Mena Creek State School in Mena Creek to the north. The nearest government secondary school are Innisfail State College in Innisfail Estate to the north-east and Tully State High School in Tully to the south.

References

Further reading

External links 

 
 Town map of Japoon, 1964

Cassowary Coast Region
Localities in Queensland
Towns in Queensland